The 1940 Arizona Wildcats football team represented the University of Arizona in the Border Conference during the 1940 college football season.  In their second season under head coach Mike Casteel, the Wildcats compiled a 7–2 record (3–1 against Border opponents), finished in second place in the conference, and outscored their opponents, 204 to 83. The team captain was John Black.  The team played its home games at Varsity Stadium in Tucson, Arizona.

Schedule

References

Arizona
Arizona Wildcats football seasons
Arizona Wildcats football